Raymond Robert Forster  (19 June 1922 – 1 July 2000) was a New Zealand arachnologist and museum director. He was a Fellow of the Entomological Society of New Zealand.

Biography
Forster was born in Hastings, New Zealand in 1922, and was educated at Victoria University College, gaining BSc, MSc(Hons) and DSc degrees.

Forster was an entomologist at the National Museum in Wellington from 1940 to 1947, with an interruption for military service during World War II.  Between 1942 and 1945 he served first in the army and then as a naval radar mechanic.  He was appointed zoologist and assistant director at Canterbury Museum in 1948, and in 1957 he moved to Otago Museum to take up the position of director.  He retired from that role in 1987.

Forster wrote his first paper on spiders at the age of 17.  Over the course of his career, more than 100 scientific papers and volumes were published bearing his name, including the definitive six-volume Spiders of New Zealand, in co-authorship with international colleagues. He also published Small Land Animals and co-authored NZ Spiders, An Introduction. Much of his work was accomplished in collaboration with his wife, Lyn Forster, a notable New Zealand arachnologist.

He researched and classified many of New Zealand's thousands of native spiders, and was responsible for establishing Otago Museum's spider collection.

Forster died in Dunedin in 2000.

Honours
In 1961, Forster was elected a Fellow of the Royal Society of New Zealand, and received two of that society's honours: the Hutton Medal in 1971; and the Hector Medal in 1983.

The University of Otago honoured Forster with the award of the degree of Doctor of Science, honoris causa, in 1978.

Forster was awarded the Queen Elizabeth II Silver Jubilee Medal in 1977, and was appointed a Companion of the Queen's Service Order for public services in the 1984 New Year Honours.

Forster was also elected a Fellow of the Entomological Society of New Zealand.

Honorific eponym
A small valley in Fiordland, Forster Burn, is named after him.

References

1922 births
2000 deaths
New Zealand arachnologists
Victoria University of Wellington alumni
Companions of the Queen's Service Order
People from Hastings, New Zealand
Directors of museums in New Zealand
Royal New Zealand Navy personnel of World War II
20th-century New Zealand zoologists
People associated with Otago Museum
New Zealand military personnel of World War II
People associated with the Museum of New Zealand Te Papa Tongarewa
Fellows of the Royal Society of New Zealand
Fellows of the Entomological Society of New Zealand